Shoshone Cavern National Monument was proclaimed by William Howard Taft on September 21, 1909. On March 17, 1954, the 83rd Congress abolished the monument and transferred the  site to the city of Cody, Wyoming. The cavern is located high up near the summit of Cedar Mountain, about 4 miles from Cody on the south side of the Shoshone River. The walls of the cavern are well covered by incrustations of crystals and dripping formations, mostly white, but some brownish or reddish in color. As of 2008, the cavern is owned by the Bureau of Land Management and is now called Spirit Mountain Cave. A permit is required to visit Spirit Mountain Cave. To obtain permits to visit the cave contact Bureau of Land Management office in the Cody WY.

References

Caves of Wyoming
Landforms of Park County, Wyoming
Former National Monuments of the United States
Bureau of Land Management areas in Wyoming
Bureau of Land Management National Monuments
Protected areas of Park County, Wyoming
Protected areas established in 1909
1909 establishments in Wyoming
1954 disestablishments in Wyoming